Alessandra Riegler (born 24 May 1961 in Modena) is an Italian chess player who holds the ICCF title of Lady Grandmaster (LGM).

She was the sixth ICCF Women's World Champion, a title she held from 2000-2005.

In 2007, Italian President Giorgio Napolitano, has awarded the title of Knight of the Order of "Merit of the Italian Republic".

Riegler is also a four-time winner of the Italian Chess Championship (1994, 1995, 1996, and 1998).

References

External links 
 
 
 

1961 births
Living people
Italian chess players
World Correspondence Chess Champions